Michigan Proposal 18-2 was a ballot initiative approved by voters in Michigan as part of the 2018 United States elections. The proposal was created in preparation of the 2020 United States Census, to move control of redistricting from the state legislature to an independent commission. The commission consists of thirteen members selected randomly by the secretary of state: four affiliated with Democrats, four affiliated with Republicans, and five independents. Any Michigan voter can apply to be a commissioner, as long as they have not been, in the last six years, a politician or lobbyist. Proponents argued that Michigan's current districts are gerrymandered, giving an unfair advantage to one political party. Opponents argued that the process would give the secretary of state too much power over redistricting, and that the people on the commission would be unlikely to understand principles of redistricting. The proposal was approved with 61.28% of the vote.

History

Background

Following the 2010 midterms in Michigan, Republicans controlled the Michigan state government, and therefore controlled redistricting. The districts they created were gerrymandered to give a partisan advantage to Republicans. In the 2012 Michigan House of Representatives election, Democrats won 53.97% of the vote, compared to 46.03% for Republicans. Despite this, Republicans won 59 seats, to Democrats' 51. A similar result occurred in 2016, with a nearly even vote (49.2%–49.13%) leading to a 16-seat advantage for Republicans. In 2019, the districts for the Michigan House, Michigan Senate, and United States House of Representatives were ruled as unconstitutional partisan gerrymandering.

Ballot access
Proposal 18-2 was a citizen-led ballot initiative, supported by the 501(c)(4) organization Voters Not Politicians. Voters Not Politicians organized the collection of more than 425,000 signatures from registered Michigan voters to allow the proposal to appear on the ballot.

Contents
The proposal appeared on the ballot as follows:

Results

The proposal was passed easily, requiring a simple majority. Washtenaw, Ingham, and Marquette counties had the highest percentage of yes vote, while Missaukee, Montmorency, Sanilac, and Osceola counties had the highest percentage of no vote. The proposal passed in 67 of Michigan's 83 counties with strong support across the state.

Post-election events

2020 redistricting

250,000 applications to serve on the commission were randomly mailed out by the Michigan secretary of state on December 30, 2019. More than 6,200 Michiganders applied to be part of the redistricting commission before the June 1, 2020, deadline. 200 semi-finalists were be selected at random by the accounting firm Rehmann LLC by the end of June. The commission finished drawing maps for the State House, State Senate, and US House in December 2021.

2022 elections 

The commissions new maps went into effect for the 2022 elections. The redrawn maps were seen as instrumental for Democratic victories in the State House and State Senate, taking control of the latter for the first time since 1984.

See also
 2018 Michigan Proposal 3 – 2018 ballot initiative to add voting policies to the state constitution, such as straight-ticket voting and same-day voter registration
 List of Michigan ballot measures
 Michigan Regulation and Taxation of Marihuana Act – 2018 ballot initiative to legalize Marijuana in Michigan

References

Michigan Proposal 2
Michigan ballot proposals
Redistricting in the United States
Proposal 2